Lásky Kačenky Strnadové is a Czech silent comedy film. It was released in 1926.

External links
 

1926 films
1926 comedy films
Czech silent films
Czech black-and-white films
Czechoslovak comedy films
1920s Czech-language films